Anne Marie Anderson (born November 25, 1967) is an American sportscaster who is a graduate of Hofstra University in New York and Cherry Creek High School in Englewood, Colorado.  She works for a variety of sports networks.

Early life and career

Anderson played volleyball for Hofstra's Pride from 1985 to 1988 (as Anne Marie Jeffords). In 1988, the team was East Coast Conference Champion and Anderson was selected as co-MVP with Kris Keigan-Pfanstiel. As of 2012, Anderson held the following career records for Hofstra Volleyball:
 #7 with block solos (98, 1985–88)
 #7 with total blocks (346, 1985–88)
 #8 with sets played (479, 1985–88)
 #9 with block assists (248, 1985–88)
 #9 with matches played (148, 1985–88)

Anderson began her television career while in college at SportsChannel New York. She worked as a camera operator, stage manager and video screener.

ESPN
Following graduation from Hofstra, Anderson relocated to Bristol, CT and worked as a production assistant, assignment editor and associate producer on ESPN staples such as SportsCenter, NFL Gameday and Outside the Lines. In 1994, she became SportsCenter's Los Angeles Bureau Producer working primarily with Shelley Smith, Andrea Kremer, Mark Schwarz, and Steve Cyphers. In 2000, Anderson moved north to be San Francisco Bureau Producer and in 2003 opened an ESPN bureau based in Colorado. As a bureau producer Anderson worked in the field on marquee events such as the Super Bowl, NBA Playoffs, Golf's majors, Heavyweight Title fights and six Olympic Games. She won three National Emmy awards as part of her work on SportsCenter.

In 2000, Anderson began to transition from behind the scenes to in front of the camera. She did features for NBA Today, SportsCenter and ESPN2. In 2003, she became a sideline reporter on college football, track and field and bowling while still maintaining her producing duties and writing Olympic features for ESPN The Magazine. Two years later she moved to the game table on live event coverage. Although she started as an analyst for volleyball, Anderson quickly transitioned to the Play by Play chair on Olympic sports.

CBS College TV (CSTV)
In 2005, Anderson left producing and focused solely on her career in front of the camera. She was a volleyball and basketball analyst for CSTV as well as play by play for track and field. She also did football sidelines and eventually basketball, volleyball, and softball play-by-play for the network.

The Mtn
In 2006, while working for CSTV and ESPN Anderson was one of the original talent for The Mtn (MountainWest Sports Network). She served in variety of roles for the regional network both in the field and in the studio. Anderson was on the sidelines for Football and the conference Basketball tournament. She called play by play on volleyball, basketball and softball for six years. During that time Anderson was the original host of Mtn Peak Performances and host a variety of other shows and formats including Around the Mtn, Mountain View, Basketball wraps and Olympic Sport preview shows.

Fox Sports Net
In 2010, Anderson hosted the PAC-10 Women's Basketball tournament on Fox Sports Net alongside Lisa Leslie, as well as served as a sideline reporter on regular season games. In 2011, Anderson filled in on FSN's The Final Score and hosted daily internet NFL and college updates on Fox.com.

Pac-12 Network
In 2012, the Pac-12 Network was launched and hired Anderson in the play by play role for their women's college sports. She can currently be seen on volleyball, soccer, basketball and softball broadcasts on the Network.

Las Vegas Aces
In 2018, Anderson became the play-by-play announcer for the Las Vegas Aces of the Women's National Basketball Association.

References

Living people
American television sports anchors
College football announcers
Women's college basketball announcers in the United States
College basketball announcers in the United States
Bowling broadcasters
Hofstra University alumni
Journalists from Colorado
American women journalists
Las Vegas Aces announcers
1967 births